Daniel Matthias Kaiser (born 3 May 2000) is a Canadian professional soccer player.

Early life
Kaiser was born and raised in Calgary, Alberta to a German father and a Canadian mother. He began playing soccer at age four with local club Calgary NSD SC and later played for Calgary Foothills. In 2016, Kaiser joined the academy program of Major League Soccer side Vancouver Whitecaps FC.

In 2018, Kaiser began attending the University of British Columbia. In the summer of 2019, he played in USL League Two with his former youth club Calgary Foothills, making six appearances.

Club career
Kaiser was selected by his hometown club Cavalry FC in the 2021 CPL–U Sports Draft, and was subsequently signed to a development contract on 18 June 2021. On 27 June 2021, he made his professional debut as a starter in a 2–1 win over York United.

In 2022, he joined League1 British Columbia side Varsity FC.

References

External links

2000 births
Living people
Association football defenders
Canadian soccer players
Soccer players from Calgary
Canadian people of German descent
UBC Thunderbirds soccer players
Calgary Foothills FC players
Cavalry FC players
USL League Two players
Canadian Premier League players
League1 British Columbia players
Nautsa’mawt FC players